The Drama Company or The Drama Company: Super Nights is an Indian comedy show on Sony TV. It premiered on 16 July 2017. It features comedians Krushna Abhishek, Ali Asgar, Sugandha Mishra, Sudesh Lehri, Sanket Bhosale and actor Mithun Chakraborty as permanent guest.

Stars

Season 1

Main cast
 Krushna Abhishek as Various characters
 Ali Asgar as Various characters
 Sanket Bhosale as Baba and Various characters
 Sugandha Mishra as Altaf Jaja, Sidhu and Various characters 
 Sudesh Lehri as Bachchan Sahab and Various characters
 Tanaji Galgunde as Various characters

Recurring cast
 Rithvik Dhanjani as Host/Presenter
 Jay Bhanushali as Host/Presenter

Guest cast
 Ankit Pathak as Guest Host (episode 17)
 Kashmera Shah as Herself (episode 15)
 Upasana Singh as Hockey Coach (episode 17)
 Sargun Mehta as Herself (episode 22)
 Gautam Mehrishi as Himself (episode 22)
 Ravi Dubey as Guest Host (episode 26–27)
 Shruti Seth as Guest Host (episode 28)
 Suresh Menon as Kachin Tendulkar (episode 30)
 Armaan Malik, Amaal Mallik & Daboo Malik as guest (episode 23rd)

Former cast
 Mithun Chakraborty as Shambu Dada
 Karan Grover as Host/Presenter
 Aru Krishansh Verma as Various characters 
 Ridhima Pandit as Various characters
 Roshni Chopra as Host/Presenter

Season 2

Main cast
 Krushna Abhishek as various characters
 Ali Asgar as Various characters
 Sanket Bhosale as Baba and Various characters
 Sugandha Mishra as Altaf Jaja, Sidhu and Various characters 
 Sudesh Lehri as Bachchan Sahab and Various characters

Former cast
 Ridhima Pandit as Various characters
 Divyanka Tripathi as Gareena Kapoor

Episode list

References

Sony Entertainment Television original programming
2010s Indian television series
Frames Production series